Samuel Tequi (10 November 1898 – 8 November 1979) was a French racing cyclist. He rode in the 1926 Tour de France.

References

1898 births
1979 deaths
French male cyclists